Sulfotransferase 1A2 is an enzyme that in humans is encoded by the SULT1A2 gene.

Sulfotransferase enzymes catalyze the sulfate conjugation of many hormones, neurotransmitters, drugs, and xenobiotic compounds. These cytosolic enzymes are different in their tissue distributions and substrate specificities. 

The gene structure (number and length of exons) is similar among family members. This gene encodes one of two phenol sulfotransferases with thermostable enzyme activity. Two alternatively spliced variants that encode the same protein have been described.

References

Further reading